The 1954 Little All-America college football team is composed of college football players from small colleges and universities who were selected by the Associated Press (AP) as the best players at each position. For 1954, the AP selected three teams of 11 players each, with no separate defensive platoons.

Running back Leo Lewis of Lincoln University (Missouri) was selected on the first team for the second consecutive year. He later played 12 years for the Winnipeg Blue Bombers and was inducted into both the Canadian Football Hall of Fame and the College Football Hall of Fame.

End R. C. Owens of the College of Idaho played eight seasons in the NFL and was inducted into the San Francisco 49ers Hall of Fame.

Center Stokeley Fulton of Hampden–Sydney College later served as head coach at his alma mater from 1960 to 1984, winning 10 conference championships.

First team
 Back - Alvin Beal (senior, 5'11", 170 pounds), Trinity (Texas)
 Back - Richard Young (senior, 5'11", 200 pounds), Chattanooga
 Back - Leo Lewis (senior, 5'11", 190 pounds), Lincoln (Missouri)
 Back - Don Miller (senior, 5'10", 165 pounds), Delaware
 End - William McKenna (senior, 6'4", 210 pounds), Brandeis
 End - R. C. Owens (junior, 6'4", 205 pounds), College of Idaho
 Tackle - Joe Veto (senior, 6'1", 210 pounds), Juniata
 Tackle - Larry Paradis (senior, 6'3", 220 pounds), Whitworth
 Guard - Robert Patterson (senior, 5'11", 195 pounds), Memphis State
 Guard - Gene Nei (senior, 5'9", 190 pounds), Gustavus Adolphus
 Center - Stokeley Fulton (senior, 5'10", 180 pounds), Hampden-Sydney

Second team
 Back - Charles Sticka, Trinity (Connecticut)
 Back - Ray Porta, Southeast Louisiana
 Back - Charles Podoley, Central Michigan
 Back - William Morton, Hobart
 End - Charles Cianciola, Lawrence (Wisconsin)
 End - Gerry Raasch, Valparaiso
 Tackle - Al Makowiecki, Florida State
 Tackle - Joe James, Howard Payne
 Guard - Luther Shealey, Presbyterian
 Guard - Victor Buccola, Cal Poly
 Center - Howard Backland, San Diego State

Third team
 Back - Elroy Payne, McMurry
 Back - Lem Harpey, College of Emporia
 Back - Dwaine Miller, Morningside
 Back - William Pappas, New Hampshire
 End - Richard Paciaroni, West Chester
 End - Von Morgan, Abilene Christian
 Tackle - Kenneth Dement, Southeast Missouri Teachers
 Tackle - Roger Higgins, Wayne (Nebraska)
 Guard - Andrew George, Willamette
 Guard - Hampton Cook, Mississippi Southern
 Center - Bill Vanderstoep, Whitworth

See also
 1954 College Football All-America Team

References

Little All-America college football team
Little All-America college football teams